The 2nd Caucasian Army Corps (Russian: 2-й Кавказский армейский корпус) was a division of the military of the Russian Empire which existed from 1879 to 1918, including the time period of World War I.

Composition
51st Infantry Division

Part of
10th Army: 1914
1st Army: 1914–1915
9th Army: 1915
13th Army: 1915
10th Army: 1915–1917

Commanders
 General G. J. Berchman: 1914
 General Samad bey Mehmandarov: 1914–1917
 Lieutenant General G. I. Choglokov: 1917

References
 A. K. Zalesskij I mirowaja wojna. Prawitieli i wojennaczalniki. wyd. WECZE Moskwa 2000.
 

Corps of the Russian Empire